Garfield Peak is a high mountain summit of the Collegiate Peaks in the Sawatch Range of the Rocky Mountains of North America. Garfield Peak was named in honor of James A. Garfield, 20th President of the United States.

See also

List of Colorado mountain ranges
List of Colorado mountain summits
List of Colorado fourteeners
List of Colorado 4000 meter prominent summits
List of the most prominent summits of Colorado
List of Colorado county high points

References

External links

Mountains of Colorado
Mountains of Chaffee County, Colorado
Mountains of Pitkin County, Colorado
San Isabel National Forest
White River National Forest
Great Divide of North America
North American 4000 m summits